Chain smoking is the practice of smoking several cigarettes in succession, sometimes using the ember of a finishing cigarette to light the next. The term chain smoker often also refers to a person who smokes relatively constantly, though not necessarily chaining each cigarette. The term applies primarily to cigarettes, although it can be used to describe incessant cigar and pipe smoking as well as vaping. It is a common indicator of addiction.

Causes
Many people chain-smoke when drinking alcoholic beverages, because alcohol potentiates nicotinic acetylcholine receptors, leading to re-sensitization, hence inducing a craving.

The extent to which chain smoking is driven by nicotine dependence has been studied. It does not seem that the amount of nicotine delivered is a significant factor, as the puff volume correlates poorly with the frequency of cigarette consumption.

Clinical use
Chain smoking is given as an example of excessive addictive behaviour in the Diagnostic and Statistical Manual of Mental Disorders. It may be used as a form of aversion therapy for smokers who are unused to such heavy smoking, inducing them to give up altogether.

Ventilation
Heating, ventilating, and air conditioning (HVAC) professionals claim that an airflow of about 30 cubic meters per minute per smoker is required to maintain satisfactory air quality when the smokers are chain smoking. However, research confirms that current HVAC systems, while important for general air quality, cannot control exposure to secondhand smoke.

See also
 Tobacco smoking
 Health effects of tobacco

References 

Smoking
Substance dependence